Sukashitrochus dorbignyi is a species of minute sea snail, a marine gastropod mollusk or micromollusk in the family Scissurellidae, the little slit snails.

Description
The thin, transparent, glassy, white shell is very small. Its height reaches 1½ mm. It has an ovate shape, and is rather depressed. It consists of 3 rather rapidly increasing whorls. It has a very peculiar sculpture. Under the rather elevated slit fasciole there are two elevated lirae, and the base has concentric lirae and grooves, while the usual growth striae are not lacking. In the example figured in the "Description of Egypt" there is a deep groove
between the keel and the upper of the two spiral lirae. In the examples observed by me (= W.H. Dall) the groove is very shallow, and bears an elevated line. The umbilicus is moderate. The oblique aperture is ovate.

Distribution
This species occurs in the Red Sea.

References

 Savigny, J-.C., 1817 Description de l'Egypte, ou recueil des observations et des recherches qui ont été faites en Egypte pendant l'expédition de l'Armée française, publié par les ordres de sa Majesté l'Empereur Napoléon le Grand. Histoire Naturelle, p. 339 pp
 Audouin, J.V., 1826 Explication sommaire des planches de Mollusques dont les dessins ont été fournis par M.J.C. Savigny, offrant une exposé des caractères naturels de genres avec les descriptions des espèces. Description l'Egypte . Histoire Naturelle, vol. 2(4), p. 1-339
 Bouchet, P. & Danrigal, F., 1982. Napoleon's Egyptian campaign (1798-1801) and the Savigny collection of shells. The Nautilus 96(1): 9-24
 Yaron, 1983. A review of the Scissurellidae (Mollusca, Gastropoda) of the Red Sea. Annalen des Naturhistorischen Museums in Wien 84B: 263-379

External links
 To Encyclopedia of Life
 To World Register of Marine Species

Scissurellidae
Gastropods described in 1826